Hanns Jana (born 18 July 1952) is a German fencer. He won a silver medal in the team épée event at the 1976 Summer Olympics.

References

External links
 

1952 births
Living people
German male fencers
Olympic fencers of West Germany
Fencers at the 1976 Summer Olympics
Olympic silver medalists for West Germany
Olympic medalists in fencing
People from Tauberbischofsheim
Sportspeople from Stuttgart (region)
Medalists at the 1976 Summer Olympics
Universiade medalists in fencing
Universiade bronze medalists for West Germany
Medalists at the 1979 Summer Universiade
20th-century German people